Lula is a town in Coahoma County, Mississippi, United States. Per the 2020 census, the population was 204.

Geography
Lula is located near the northern border of Coahoma County. U.S. Route 49 passes southwest of the town, and U.S. Route 61 passes east of the town. US 49 leads northwest  to Helena, Arkansas, while US 61 leads north  to Tunica.

Tornado
On April 26, 2011, a tornado—part of the 2011 Super Outbreak—traveled from Elaine, Arkansas, to Lula. The tornado ripped the roof off a church near Lula.

Demographics

2020 census

Note: the US Census treats Hispanic/Latino as an ethnic category. This table excludes Latinos from the racial categories and assigns them to a separate category. Hispanics/Latinos can be of any race.

2000 Census
At the 2000 census, there were 370 people, 134 households and 84 families residing in the town. The population density was 888.3 per square mile (340.1/km). There were 142 housing units at an average density of 340.9 per square mile (130.5/km2). The racial makeup was 77.30% African American, 19.73% White, 1.89% Asian, and 1.08% from two or more races.

There were 134 households, of which 28.4% had children under the age of 18 living with them, 32.8% were married couples living together, 25.4% had a female householder with no husband present, and 37.3% were non-families. 35.1% of all households were made up of individuals, and 24.6% had someone living alone who was 65 years of age or older. The average household size was 2.76 and the average family size was 3.58.

30.8% of the population were under the age of 18, 9.5% from 18 to 24, 22.7% from 25 to 44, 16.8% from 45 to 64, and 20.3% who were 65 years of age or older. The median age was 33 years. For every 100 females, there were 93.7 males. For every 100 females age 18 and over, there were 85.5 males.

The median household income was $23,125 and the median family income was $33,295. Males had a median income of $26,944 and females $19,318. The per capita income was $12,008. About 35.6% of families and 39.3% of the population were below the poverty line, including 59.1% of those under age 18 and 39.2% of those age 65 or over.

Education
The town of Lula is served by the Coahoma County School District. Residents are served by Coahoma County Junior-Senior High School.

Notable people
Rex Armistead (1930-2013), former investigator of the Mississippi State Sovereignty Commission and controversial private detective
Unita Blackwell, civil rights activist
Sam Carr, blues drummer
Maud Jeffries, actress
Ransom A. Myers, marine biologist
Bertha Lee Pate, blues singer

References

Towns in Coahoma County, Mississippi
Towns in Mississippi